Charles Ermolenko (born 9 November 1968) is a former international speedway rider from the United States.

Speedway career 
Ermolenko rode in the top tier of British Speedway from 1991 to 1997, riding primarily for Wolverhampton Wolves. He was an integral part of the Wolves team that won the league during the 1991 British League season.

Family
His older brother Sam Ermolenko is a former speedway world champion.

References 

Living people
1968 births
American speedway riders
Glasgow Tigers riders
King's Lynn Stars riders
Long Eaton Invaders riders
Wolverhampton Wolves riders
People from Artesia, California